Alberto Michelini (born 25 July 1941) is an Italian journalist and politician, former Deputy and Member of the European Parliament.

Biography 
Michelini began his journalistic career in the late 1970s at the TG1 as host and special correspondent: he was one of the first who interviewed Pope John Paul II and later wrote ten books about his pontificate. In 1981, Michelini, as correspondent in Vatican City, documented the Pope John Paul II assassination attempt.

An expert of Vatican history, Michelini joined the Christian Democracy with which he is elected to the European Parliament in 1984 and 1989 and to the Chamber of Deputies in 1987 and 1992.

In 1994, Michelini is re-elected to the Chamber of Deputies with the Segni Pact, but left the party after few months. The following year, Michelini joined Silvio Berlusconi's Forza Italia and became the Pole for Freedoms candidate for the office of President of Lazio at the 1995 regional election but is defeated by the Olive Tree candidate and former colleague Piero Badaloni.

In 2006, Michelini left Forza Italia due to his contrariness in supporting the candidacy of Gianni Alemanno as Mayor of Rome and gave his support to the incumbent Mayor Walter Veltroni.

References

External links 
Files about his parliamentary activities (in Italian): X, XI, XII, XIII, XIV, legislature

1941 births
Living people
Christian Democracy (Italy) politicians
Forza Italia politicians
20th-century Italian politicians
21st-century Italian politicians
Italian journalists